Xalxal (also spelled as Khalkhal') is the Lezgin village and municipality in the Oghuz Rayon of Azerbaijan.  It has a population of 767.

References 

Populated places in Oghuz District